Tatu Mäkelä (born 14 June 1988) is a Finnish former professional footballer who played as a left-back.

External links

Hameenlinian Web

1988 births
Living people
Finnish footballers
FC Hämeenlinna players
FC Lahti players
Porin Palloilijat players
Association football defenders
Musan Salama players
Sportspeople from Pori
Finland youth international footballers